Panfilovskaya is a station on the Moscow Central Circle of the Moscow Metro. The station opened in November 2016 and was the 31st and final station to open on the line.

The station is named for the street on which it is situated, Ulitsa Panfilova. Ulitsa Panfilova is named for Ivan Panfilov, a Soviet general at the Battle of Moscow in World War II. During construction, the station's name was slated to be Khodynka; however, prior to the line's opening, the city changed the name, citing resident requests.

References

External links 
 mkzd.ru

Moscow Metro stations
Railway stations in Russia opened in 2016
Moscow Central Circle stations